The 2012 Delaware gubernatorial election took place on November 6, 2012, to elect the governor of Delaware. Incumbent Democratic Governor Jack Markell won re-election to a second term, defeating Republican challenger Jeff Cragg in a landslide by a margin of over 40 points.

General election
Democrat and Republican candidates were unopposed in their party primaries, which were held on September 11. The Green Party candidate was endorsed by the Green Party of Delaware at their annual meeting on May 11.

Candidates
 Jeff Cragg (R), businessman
 Jack Markell (D), incumbent Governor
 Mark Perri (G)

Predictions

Debates
Complete video of debate, October 17, 2012

Results

See also
2012 Delaware elections
2012 United States gubernatorial elections
2012 Delaware lieutenant gubernatorial election
2012 United States House of Representatives election in Delaware
2012 United States Senate election in Delaware

References

External links
 Delaware Office of the Elections Commission

Official campaign websites (Archived)
 Jeff Cragg for Governor
 Jack Markell for Governor

Gubernatorial
2012
Delaware